Dedi Gusmawan (born 27 December 1985) is an Indonesian professional footballer who plays as a defender for Liga 1 club PSS Sleman.

International career
Dedi won his first cap for Indonesia in a friendly match against Cambodia on September 25, 2014, where he played as a substitute.

Career statistics

International appearances

References

External links
 Dedi Gusmawan at Soccerway
 Dedi Gusmawan at Liga Indonesia

1985 births
Living people
Indonesian footballers
People from Deli Serdang Regency
Sportspeople from North Sumatra
Indonesian Premier Division players
Liga 1 (Indonesia) players
Liga 2 (Indonesia) players
Myanmar National League players
PSDS Deli Serdang players
PSPS Pekanbaru players
Mitra Kukar players
Zeyashwemye F.C. players
Semen Padang F.C. players
PSM Makassar players
Persita Tangerang players
PSS Sleman players
Indonesian expatriate footballers
Expatriate footballers in Myanmar
Association football defenders
21st-century Indonesian people